Maydan is a village in Batken Region of Kyrgyzstan. It is part of the Kadamjay District. Its population was 2,168 in 2021.

Nearby towns and villages include Pum, Austan and Kara-Kyshtak.

References

External links 
Satellite map at Maplandia.com

Populated places in Batken Region